Trust Fund refers to funds in a Trust.

It may also refer to:

 Trust Fund (band), English band
 Trust Fund (film), 2016 American film